The following radio stations broadcast on FM frequency 93.1 MHz:

Argentina
 LRI818 Frecuencia Plus in Rosario, Santa Fe
 Radio María in Necochea, Buenos Aires
 Radio María in Las Varillas, Córdoba
 Radio María in Cinco Saltos, Río Negro
 Radio María in San José de Metán, Salta

Australia
 2WZD in Wagga Wagga, New South Wales
 Radio TAB in Kingaroy, Queensland
 Radio TAB in Stanthorpe, Queensland
 4RGB in Bundaberg, Queensland
 Magic FM (Renmark) in Renmark, South Australia
 SBS Radio in Melbourne, Victoria
 Real FM in Mudgee, New South Wales

Canada (Channel 226)
 CBF-FM-2 in Magog, Quebec
 CBJ-FM-3 in Dolbeau, Quebec
 CBPN-FM in Golden, British Columbia
 CBRG-FM in Princeton, British Columbia
 CBSI-FM-4 in Labrador City, Newfoundland and Labrador
 CBTY-FM in Lytton, British Columbia
 CFAA-FM in Baie James, Quebec
 CFBD-FM in Baie James, Quebec
 CFBS-FM-1 in Middle Bay, Quebec
 CFBS-FM-2 in Riviere-St-Paul, Quebec
 CFDD-FM in Keyano, Quebec
 CFIS-FM in Prince George, British Columbia
 CFIY-FM in Campbell River, British Columbia
 CFNO-FM in Marathon, Ontario
 CFOB-FM in Fort Frances, Ontario
 CFRG-FM in Gravelbourg, Saskatchewan
 CFRY-1-FM in Portage la Prairie, Manitoba
 CHAY-FM in Barrie, Ontario
 CHIM-FM-5 in Red Deer, Alberta
 CHLQ-FM in Charlottetown, Prince Edward Island
 CHMK-FM in Manouane, Quebec
 CHMT-FM in Timmins, Ontario
 CIFM-FM-8 in Chase, British Columbia
 CIHQ-FM in Champion, Quebec
 CILK-FM-1 in Big White Mountain, British Columbia
 CISE-FM in Wolseley, Saskatchewan
 CJRA-FM in Rainbow Lake, Alberta
 CJRF-FM in Bromptonville, Quebec
 CJTB-FM in Tete-a-la-Baleine, Quebec
 CJXX-FM in Grande Prairie, Alberta
 CKBW-2-FM in Shelburne, Nova Scotia
 CKCU-FM in Ottawa, Ontario
 CKVM-FM in Ville-Marie, Quebec
 CKYE-FM in Vancouver, British Columbia
 VF2474 in Fraser Lake, British Columbia
 VF2543 in Port Hardy, British Columbia

China 
 CNR The Voice of China in Qingdao

Japan
 Radio Okinawa in Naha, Okinawa

Latvia
 Latvijas Radio 5 nationwide

Mexico
XHAAA-FM in Reynosa, Tamaulipas
XHCRA-FM in Álamo-Temapache, Veracruz
XHCSV-FM in Coatzacoalcos, Veracruz
XHCTO-FM in Torreón, Coahuila
XHEI-FM in San Luis Potosí (Mexquitic de Carmona), San Luis Potosí
XHEPB-FM in Hermosillo, Sonora
XHERZ-FM in León, Guanajuato
XHESJC-FM in San José del Cabo, Baja California Sur
XHEUH-FM in Tehuacán, Puebla
XHKQ-FM in Tapachula, Chiapas
XHLIA-FM in Morelia, Michoacán
XHMZT-FM in Mazatlán, Sinaloa
XHNRC-FM in Nueva Rosita, Coahuila
 XHPBJR-FM in San Juan del Río, Querétaro
 XHPEBS-FM in Ciudad Del Carmen, Campeche
XHPI-FM in Guadalajara, Jalisco
XHREZ-FM in Tuxtla Gutiérrez, Chiapas
XHYI-FM in Cancún, Quintana Roo

Morocco
Radio 2M in Agadir

Philippines
DWRX in Manila
DYWF in Cebu City
DXAC in Davao City
DXRX in Zamboanga City

United Kingdom
 BBC Radio Foyle in Derry, Northern Ireland

United States (Channel 226)
  in New Ulm, Minnesota
  in Perryville, Missouri
 KBOI-FM in New Plymouth, Idaho
  in Los Angeles, California
  in Pollock Pines, California
 KFCW in Riverton, Wyoming
 KFEX-LP in Chanute, Kansas
  in Sidney, Montana
 KGTC-LP in Oroville, Washington
 KHCU in Concan, Texas
  in Conway, Arkansas
 KHMY in Pratt, Kansas
 KHRU-LP in Libby, Montana
  in Pago Pago, American Samoa
  in Shafter, California
  in Yankton, South Dakota
  in Yuma, Arizona
 KMCS in Muscatine, Iowa
 KMGJ in Grand Junction, Colorado
 KMKT in Bells, Texas
 KMWB in Captain Cook, Hawaii
 KNHS-LP in Lafayette, Louisiana
 KOOJ-LP in Pittsburg, Kansas
  in Patterson, California
 KPBC-LP in Childress, Texas
 KPPO in Mapusaga, American Samoa
 KPWS-LP in Manhattan, Montana
  in Alexandria, Louisiana
  in Amarillo, Texas
  in Honolulu, Hawaii
 KRBH-LP in Red Bluff, California
 KRCS in Sturgis, South Dakota
 KRJN in Log Lane Village, Colorado
  in Lexington, Nebraska
  in Gladstone, Oregon
 KSII in El Paso, Texas
 KSLG-FM in Arcata, California
 KSTV-FM in Dublin, Texas
  in Tyler, Texas
  in Boonville, Missouri
 KWLB in Red Oak, Oklahoma
 KXSM in Chualar, California
 KYMT in Las Vegas, Nevada
  in Batesville, Arkansas
 WACV in Coosada, Alabama
  in Blakely, Georgia
 WCHZ-FM in Warrenton, Georgia
  in Pikeville, Kentucky
 WDLP-LP in Belding, Michigan
 WDRQ in Detroit, Michigan
 WDWR-LP in Ava Maria, Florida
  in Springfield, Georgia
  in Wildwood Crest, New Jersey
 WFEZ (FM) in Miami, Florida
  in Lima, Ohio
  in Barrackville, West Virginia
 WGAG-LP in Princeton, West Virginia
  in Sumrall, Mississippi
 WGMZ in Glencoe, Alabama
 WHBI-LP in Grantville, Pennsylvania
  in Springfield, Massachusetts
 WIBC (FM) in Indianapolis, Indiana
  in Iron Mountain, Michigan
 WJBL in Ladysmith, Wisconsin
 WJEH-FM in Racine, Ohio
 WJQM in De Forest, Wisconsin
 WKRO-FM in Port Orange, Florida
 WLEB-LP in Lebanon, Pennsylvania
  in Portland, Maine
 WMIY-LP in Baton Rouge, Louisiana
  in Monticello, Kentucky
 WMLY-LP in Marshall, Michigan
 WMPA in Ferrysburg, Michigan
 WNBO-LP in Americus, Georgia
 WNOX in Karns, Tennessee
 WNTQ in Syracuse, New York
  in Paterson, New Jersey
  in Winston-Salem, North Carolina
  in Baltimore, Maryland
 WPQP in Clearfield, Pennsylvania
 WRHJ-LP in Rock Hill, South Carolina
  in Benton, Tennessee
 WSRD-LP in Albany, Georgia
  in Staunton, Virginia
  in Clarksville, Indiana
 WTJS in Alamo, Tennessee
 WTJW-LP in Jasper, Indiana
 WTJX-FM in Charlotte Amalie, U.S. Virgin Islands
 WUCG-LP in Blairsville, Georgia
 WWKM in Rochelle, Georgia
 WWLB in Ettrick, Virginia
 WWSR in Lima, Ohio
 WXRT in Chicago, Illinois
  in Decatur, Illinois
 WZAK in Cleveland, Ohio
  in Batesburg, South Carolina

Lists of radio stations by frequency